Odd Is an Egg is a 2016 animated, short film directed by Kristin Ulseth and written by Maria Avramova and Kristen Ulseth. The Film is based on a book of the same name by Lisa Aisato.

Awards

References

External links
 

2016 short films
Norwegian animated short films
Portuguese animated short films
2016 films